"Outside My Window" is a 2010 song by Sarah Buxton.

Outside My Window may also refer to:

Outside My Window, a 1968 book by Liesel Moak Skorpen
Outside My Window, classical composition by Tim Hagans

Songs
"Outside My Window", a 1960 single by The Fleetwoods 
"Outside My Window", a 1980 single by Stevie Wonder from Stevie Wonder's Journey Through "The Secret Life of Plants"
"Outside my Window", a song by Ryad Kerbouz from Legends of Laurel Canyon
"Outside my Window", a song by Ten Years After from About Time, 1989
"Outside My Window", a song by Euros Childs from album The Miracle Inn, 2007
"Outside My Window", a song by Jude (singer)
"Outside my Window", a song by Bizzy Bone and Bad Azz from Thug Pound, 2009
"Outside My Window", a song by Luke Dalton, Zodiac Records (New Zealand)